Brett Michael Reid, OAM (born 29 October 1976) is an Australian Paralympic swimmer with an intellectual disability.  He was born in Melbourne. He participated but did not win any medals at the 1996 Atlanta Paralympics. He won a gold medal at the 2000 Sydney Paralympics in the Men's 4x100 m Freestyle S14 event, for which he received a Medal of the Order of Australia. In 2000, he received an Australian Sports Medal.

References

Male Paralympic swimmers of Australia
Swimmers at the 1996 Summer Paralympics
Swimmers at the 2000 Summer Paralympics
Medalists at the 2000 Summer Paralympics
Paralympic gold medalists for Australia
Intellectual Disability category Paralympic competitors
Swimmers from Melbourne
Recipients of the Medal of the Order of Australia
Recipients of the Australian Sports Medal
1976 births
Living people
Sportspeople with intellectual disability
Paralympic medalists in swimming
Australian male freestyle swimmers
S14-classified Paralympic swimmers